Tephritis sonchina is a species of tephritid or fruit flies in the genus Tephritis of the family Tephritidae.

Distribution
Russia, China.

References

Tephritinae
Insects described in 1937
Diptera of Asia